Signal Books is a British book publisher.

Signal is based in Oxford, England. It specialises in biography, current affairs, history, philosophy, religion, and travel.

Selected books 
 First Overland: London-Singapore by Land Rover (2005). .
 The Portuguese:A Modern History (2011). .
 Oxford Boy: A Post-War Townie Childhood (2018). .
 The Silent Traveller in London (2001). .
 The Silent Traveller in Oxford (2003). .

References

External links
 Signal Books website
 The Signal Books Blog

Companies with year of establishment missing
Book publishing companies of England
Companies based in Oxford